The Spiritwood Incident was a shooting that occurred on July 7, 2006, during a police pursuit in Saskatchewan, Canada, killing two of the three RCMP officers involved.

Incident
On July 7, 2006, two officers from the RCMP detachment in Spiritwood, Constables Robin Cameron (29), Marc Bourdages (26), and Michelle Knopp, responded to a complaint of an assault at a home close to the detachment. A man later identified as Curtis Alfred Dagenais fled the scene in a pickup truck. The officers followed, and the ensuing pursuit lasted . During the chase, gunfire was exchanged between the officers and Dagenais. Cameron and Bourdages were both shot in the head through their car windshield while Knopp was struck by bullet fragments. Dagenais abandoned his car and escaped on foot.

Working in the nearby town of Shellbrook that night, Staff Sergeant Barry Thomas received a call for back-up, and was one of the first officers to find the constables at the scene. The two officers later died of their wounds, Cameron on July 15 and Bourdages early the next morning, on July 16. The bullet fragments that struck Knopp have since remained embedded in her ear, arm, and torso.

A massive manhunt failed to find Dagenais, who turned himself in without incident to the RCMP's Spiritwood detachment on July 18, after twelve days. While he was on the run, Dagenais mailed a self-justifying 5-page letter to the Edmonton Sun.

Trial and aftermath
Dagenais' trial took place in 2009 at the Court of Queen's Bench for Saskatchewan in Saskatoon, before Justice Gerald Allbright. During the trial, Dagenais argued he had not intentionally shot the officers. He claimed that he feared for his life and shot in blind panic out in self-defence and that the three officers fired first after ramming his truck. The Crown argued that it was Dagenais who had fired first and intentionally shot the officers.

After two days of deliberations, on 12 March 2009, the jury found him guilty of two counts of first-degree murder and one count of attempted murder. He is not eligible for parole until 2031.

On 17 September 2012, Dagenais was granted an appeal date for October 25. After less than 10 minutes of deliberation, the appeal was dismissed on all 3 points.

The surviving officer from the incident, Constable Michelle Knopp, was awarded the Medal of Bravery on 26 February 2009, which was invested on 6 May 2011.

See also
David Wynn
Mayerthorpe tragedy
 Moncton shooting

References

External links
Globe And Mail: Suspect in RCMP Slayings surrenders.
Globe And Mail: RCMP officers succumb to their wounds
CBC News: Jury convicts Dagenais of first-degree murder in Mountie killings

Canadian police officers killed in the line of duty
July 2006 crimes
July 2006 events in Canada
Manhunts
People murdered in Saskatchewan
Royal Canadian Mounted Police
Spiritwood No. 496, Saskatchewan
2006 in Saskatchewan
2006 murders in Canada